"Am I Evil?" is a song by British heavy metal band Diamond Head. Released on the band's 1980 debut album Lightning to the Nations, it remains the band's signature song. The song was written by lead vocalist Sean Harris and guitarist Brian Tatler and released by Happy Face Records, a label owned by the producer Muff Murfin of The Old Smithy studio of Worcester, England. 

The song was immediately popular amongst heavy metal fans in the United Kingdom upon its initial release, but only rose to international prominence after Metallica covered the song as a B-side on their 1984 single "Creeping Death"; the cover was then re-released on their 1998 cover album Garage Inc. The song was influenced by Black Sabbath's 1975 song "Symptom of the Universe". The song starts with an instrumental segment with excerpts of Gustav Holst's The Planets (1914–16).

Release and reception
The song was originally released on Diamond Head's 1980 debut, Lightning to the Nations, but then also re-recorded for their second album Borrowed Time. Previously, in 1979, the band had already performed the song in a televised performance at West Bromwich College, which was their first TV appearance. It remains a live favourite and is still included in the band's setlist to this day. However, Sean Harris has gotten fed up with continually playing "Am I Evil?", one of the reasons he took the stage dressed as the Grim Reaper during their performance at the National Bowl.

The song has roots with Gustav Holst's "Mars, the Bringer of War" (from The Planets Suite) and used a riff, that was used earlier on "Ring of Fire" by The Eric Burdon Band in 1974.

Cover versions

The song was made most famous by Metallica's cover of the song, originally released as a B-side to the "Creeping Death" single in 1984, included on the 1988 Japanese re-release of its debut album, Kill 'Em All, and later re-released on Garage Inc. in 1998. The song has also been featured in Metallica's live set throughout its career, often in a faster and heavier version. Lead singer James Hetfield also changed the final chorus from "Am I evil? Yes, I am" to "Am I evil? Yes, I fucking am!" Diamond Head has stated that the band's members are flattered by the cover and that the royalties from it have enabled the band to continue. Faith No More also has covered the song.

In 2010, at The Big Four: Live from Sofia, Bulgaria concert, in an extended homage to the song, the united members of the "Big Four" of American thrash metal—Metallica, Anthrax, Slayer and Megadeth—performed the song together. With the exclusion of Slayer's Tom Araya and Jeff Hanneman, the combined members of these bands performed the first half of the song. The recording was released later on DVD (The Big Four: Live from Sofia, Bulgaria).

At the U.K part of the Sonisphere Festival, Bill Bailey used the song as an intro to his set. Diamond Head themselves were also performing at the festival.

In the 1996 video game The Neverhood, there is a cutscene in which Klaymen pulls a pin that keeps two halves of the Neverhood separated when the sides are coming together; an altered version of the Metallica cover is played.

Usage in popular culture
The original Diamond Head version of the song is included in the 2009 video games Guitar Hero: Metallica and Brütal Legend, as well as the 2009 film Halloween II. A cover of the Metallica version is included in the game Rock Revolution as a playable track.

Parody band Beatallica recorded a mashup of "Am I Evil?" and the Beatles' "And I Love Her" entitled "And I'm Evil", on their 2009 album Masterful Mystery Tour.

References

1980 songs
1984 songs
Diamond Head (band) songs
Metallica songs